Something for All of Us... is the first solo album by the Broken Social Scene co-founder Brendan Canning. The album is the second in a series entitled Broken Social Scene Presents:, each album in the series being a particular member's solo efforts, assisted by fellow Broken Social Scene members — the first being Kevin Drew's Spirit If....

"Hit the Wall" is the album's first single and was made available as a free download on the Arts & Crafts website on May 5, 2008. The album was released to retail on July 22, 2008. Due to the leak of an unmastered version in mid-June, Canning released the album as a digital download.

The album was generally warmly received. The album currently has a score of 70 out of 100 on Metacritic with praise from The Boston Globe, Billboard, No Ripcord, Almost Cool and Delusions of Adequacy. The album sold fairly well, reaching #17 on the Billboard Top Heatseekers chart.

Track listing
 "Something for All of Us" – 5:34
 "Chameleon" – 4:52
 "Hit the Wall" – 4:51
 "Snowballs & Icicles" – 2:49
 "Churches Under the Stairs" – 4:20
 "Love Is New" – 4:07
 "Antique Bull" – 3:43
 "All the Best Wooden Toys Come from Germany" – 2:53
 "Possible Grenade" – 4:40
 "Been at It So Long" – 5:09
 "Take Care, Look Up" – 5:17
 "Don't Pull the Strings Back" (iTunes bonus track) – 4:46

Music videos
 "Hit the Wall"
 "Churches Under the Stairs"
 "Love Is New"

References

2008 albums
Brendan Canning albums
Arts & Crafts Productions albums